Coomes may refer to:

 Sam Coomes, an American musician, and one-half of the Portland-area indie band Quasi, along with drummer and ex-wife Janet Weiss. 
 Penny Coomes, an English ice dancer who represents the United Kingdom.

See also 
 Coombs (disambiguation)